Vahrn is a comune (municipality) in South Tyrol in northern Italy, located about  northeast of the city of Bolzano.

Geography
Vahrn borders the following municipalities: Brixen, Klausen, Franzensfeste, Natz-Schabs, Sarntal and Feldthurns.

Frazioni
The municipality of Vahrn contains the frazione (subdivision) Neustift (Novacella) and the valley of Schalders (Scaleres).

History

Coat-of-arms
The emblem is quartering: the first and the fourth of argent three fess nebuly azure; the second and the third of gules. It’s the arms of the Knights of Voitsberg which changed the name in Von Vahrn when they acquired the local castle, then destroyed in 1277. The emblem was granted in 1969.

Society

Linguistic distribution
According to the 2011 census, 87.80% of the population speak German, 11.18% Italian and 1.02% Ladin as first language.

Demographic evolution

See also 
 Neustift Abbey, an Augustinian abbey in the municipality

References

External links
 Homepage of the municipality

Municipalities of South Tyrol

vi:Varna